The 2002–03 season was the 94th year of football played by Dundee United, and covers the period from 1 July 2002 to 30 June 2003. United finished the season in eighth place.

United were knocked out of the Tennent's Scottish Cup by Hibernian in the third round, and were beaten by Celtic in the CIS Insurance Cup semi-finals.

Review and events
What had begun with optimism and hopes that United could continue the progress made the previous year would end up being statistically the club's worst season since before World War II. Eddie Thompson took over as chairman with the season barely a month old and quickly sacked Alex Smith, though a run of just two wins from the first ten games did not help the manager's cause. After a failed attempt to recruit Ian McCall, Paul Hegarty was put in charge provisionally until the end of the season. While the former club hero got off to a decent start with 7 points from five matches, a dismal run of ten weeks without a win followed, leading to Hegarty being dismissed at the end of January and McCall being successfully recruited.

The key factor in McCall's change of heart was that while his previous club Falkirk were runaway leaders of the First Division, it was by now evident that they were unlikely to be promoted as their ground did not meet the SPL's requirements. McCall still had the task of keeping United off the bottom of the table in the unlikely event that the SPL had a change of heart or one of the chasing pack overhauled Falkirk, and he ultimately managed this with an excellent run of form after the SPL split, leaving them to finish eleventh. However, this good finish could not mask what had been an extremely poor season by any measure, and left McCall facing a major reconstruction job.

Match results
Dundee United played a total of 43 competitive matches during the 2002–03 season. The team finished eleventh in the Scottish Premier League.

In the cup competitions, United were knocked out of the Tennent's Scottish Cup in the third round, losing at home to Hibernian. Celtic knocked United out of the CIS Cup in the semi-finals.

Legend

All results are written with Dundee United's score first.

Bank of Scotland Premierleague

Tennent's Scottish Cup

CIS Insurance Cup

Player details
During the 2002–03 season, United used 32 different players, with a further played named as a substitute who did not make an appearance on the pitch. The table below shows the number of appearances and goals scored by each player.

|}

Goalscorers
Thirteen players scored for the United first team with the team scoring 43 goals in total. Steven Thompson and Jim McIntyre were the top goalscorers, scoring nine goals apiece.

Discipline
During the 2001–02 season, five United players were sent off, and 20 players received at least one yellow card. In total, the team received six dismissals and 67 cautions.

Team statistics

League table

Transfers

In
Six players were signed during the 2002–03 season, with a total (public) transfer cost of around £150,000. Four players were also signed for the following season. In addition, two players were signed on loan.

The players that joined Dundee United during the 2001–02 season, along with their previous club, are listed below.

Loans in

Out
Eight players left the club during the season with only one transfer – Steven Thompson to Rangers – bringing in a fee (£200k). Two players were loaned out during the season with six also released before next season.

Listed below are the players that were released during the season, along with the club that they joined. Players did not necessarily join their next club immediately.

Loans out

Playing kit

The jerseys were sponsored by Telewest for the last time.

Awards
 Mark Wilson
 Scottish Premier League Young Player of the Month: 1
 November 2002

See also
 2002–03 Scottish Premier League
 2002–03 Scottish Cup
 2002–03 in Scottish football

References

External links
 Official site: 2002/03 Results
 Soccerbase
 Results
 Squad stats
 Transfers

2002-03
Scottish football clubs 2002–03 season